The Municipal Corporation Building, Thrissur, is the seat of the Thrissur Municipal Corporation and  is situated in the middle of Thrissur city, Kerala, India.

History 
Thrissur Municipality came into existence in 1921 and the first council was elected near the Paramekkavu Bagavathi Temple pond. In the same year, municipal council decided to shift its office to a two room in the Government Guest house in Shoranur Road. In 1932, 7 July, Dewan C.G. Herbert laid the foundation stone for the new municipal building near the Vadakkunnathan Temple. On 29 December, then Dewan of Kochi, J.W.U. Bor inaugurated the new municipal building. 

The building was designed in the British architecture style. The main attraction of the building was Westminster Quarters chiming clock. This was installed by P.OOR Sons in Madras. The clock has a mechanical key system which has to be keyed every day. The clock was made from copper. It was M.R. Menon, then the Chairman of municipality who brought the clock from Madras. After Thrissur Municipal Corporation was formed in 1998, it came to be known as Municipal Corporation Building, but still the road on the front is known as 'Municipal Office Road'.

References

Buildings and structures in Thrissur
Municipal buildings in India
Government buildings in Kerala
Government of Thrissur